The Delaware Fightin' Blue Hens baseball team is the varsity intercollegiate athletic team of the University of Delaware in Newark, Delaware, United States. The team competes in the National Collegiate Athletic Association's Division I and are members of the Colonial Athletic Association.

References

External links